Lovászhetény is a village in Baranya county, Hungary.

Populated places in Baranya County